NA-249 Karachi Central-III is a constituency for the National Assembly of Pakistan.

Area
This constituency includes neighborhoods of Liaquatabad, named after first Prime Minister of Pakistan Liaquat Ali Khan , and Nazimabad, named after second Prime Minister of Pakistan Khawaja Nazimuddin.

According to statistics, the total population of the area covered in NA-255 is 755,412, and of them, 460,110 are registered voters; 255,753 of total voters in the constituency are male while the constituency has 204,357 female voters.

Members of Parliament

2018-2022: NA-255 Karachi Central-III

Election 2002 

General elections were held on 10 Oct 2002. Israr-Ul-Ebad Khan of Muttahida Qaumi Movement won by 51,564 votes.

Election 2008 

General elections were held on 18 Feb 2008. Syed Asif Husnain of Muttahida Qaumi Movement won his seat and became member of National Assembly.

Election 2013 

General elections were held on 11 May 2013. Sufyan Yousuf of Muttahida Qaumi Movement won by 126,263 votes and became the member of National Assembly.

Election 2018 

General elections were held on 25 July 2018.

†MQM-P is considered heir apparent to MQM

See also
NA-248 Karachi Central-II
NA-250 Karachi Central-IV

References

External links 
Election result's official website

NA-247
Karachi